Cyrtodactylus laevigatus is a species of gecko that is endemic to Komodo in Indonesia.

References 

Cyrtodactylus
Reptiles described in 1964
Taxa named by Ilya Darevsky